The Canoe Creek clubshell (Pleurobema athearni), also known as the Canoe Creek pigtoe, is an endangered species of freshwater mussel, an aquatic bivalve mollusk in the family Unionidae, the river mussels.

This species is endemic to the United States, only occurring in Alabama in the watershed of Big Canoe Creek, a tributary of Coosa River.

The U.S. Fish and Wildlife Service listed the species as endangered in July 2022.

References

Molluscs of the United States
Pleurobema
Bivalves described in the 21st century
ESA endangered species